BCSA Ltd is a trade association for the structural steel industry in the UK and Ireland. It lobbies on behalf of its members, and provides them with education and technical services.

A subsidiary, Steel Construction Certification Scheme Ltd, runs the UKAS accredited Steel Construction Certificate Scheme (SCCS). It provides certification for steelwork contracting organisations under ISO 9001, ISO 3834, ISO 14001 and ISO 45001.

The association, its marketing initiative Steel for Life Ltd, and the Steel Construction Institute manage online resource, Steel Construction Info.

In addition to London headquarters, it maintains offices near Doncaster Sheffield Airport.

History

The association arose from a series of mergers involving regional and sector specific associations.

Five steelwork contractors in Manchester began to collaborate in 1906, and then formally established the Steelwork Society in 1908. The Rules were only finalised in 1911. Steel producers had benefited from trade associations as a forum to collude on pricing, and steelwork contractors sought the same advantages.

Similar groups established themselves around the country, and joint meetings were held. In the early 1930s the British Steelwork Association operated from London as a national, federated association funded by, and representing, the local associations.

The British Constructional Steelwork Association was formed, in 1936, to succeed the British Steelwork Association. In return for recognition from the steel manufacturers in raw material negotiations, their fabrication subsidiaries were permitted to join the new association. Membership immediately jumped from 92 to 159.

In 1966 The British Constructional Steelwork Association Ltd incorporated to take over all the activities of the British Constructional Steelwork Association, Bridge and Constructional Ironwork Association, London Constructional Engineers Association, Midland Structural Association, Scottish Structural Steel Association, Steelwork Society, Northern Ireland Steelwork Association, and Structural Export Association.

The name changed to BCSA Ltd in 1990 though it commonly operates under the name of a subsidiary called the British Constructional Steelwork Association Ltd, incorporated at that time.

Membership of the association was initially limited to structural steel contractors until in 1987, other companies that shared the association's objects began to be admitted as associates. The rules of the association were amended accordingly in 1994.

The British Constructional Steelwork Association Ltd purchased a 99 year lease on its Whitehall Court headquarters in 1989 for £610,000. It previously operated from nearby premises at 35 Old Queen Street.

Price fixing

Collusion on pricing had been an important part of early trade associations in the iron and steel industries. Trade associations of structural steel contractors were no different, and even then this was controversial. The British Constructional Steelwork Association identify instances of members of their predecessor organisations, cautious about the legality of these schemes, hiding behind code names and numbers.

Association practice was to share tender lists for contracts, and where that consisted wholly of members, to add % to the tender price of the chosen contractor, to be shared amongst the other members on the tender list. During the 1920s, economic pressures encouraged almost all structural steel contractors to join the associations. Tenders were routinely member only, significantly curtailing competition. Some contractors were alleged to have joined tender lists with no intention of bidding, merely to claim their share of the %.

Government imposed prohibitive tariffs on imported fabricated steel in 1932. Real competition to the structural steel contractors came only from domestic steel manufacturers with their own, in house, fabrication capability, and emerging construction techniques with reinforced concrete. The 1936 arrangement to admit fabrication subsidiaries of steel manufacturers to the association drew them also into the cartel.

During the Second World War the Ministry of Supply enforced control on maximum structural steel prices through an Iron and Steel Control department.

Post war, it was common for structural steel contractors to submit identical bids in response to tenders. Government became more concerned with anti-competitive behaviour, and the structural steel industry's highly developed, overt bid rigging received particular attention. The Monopolies and Restrictive Practices Commission launched an investigation and the industry was required to register its practices under the Restrictive Trade Practices Act 1956. Registration provided for further scrutiny.

The Registrar promptly challenged restrictions on trade, and price fixing, imposed by the British Constructional Steelwork Association upon its members, under the new Restrictive Practices Court Act 1958. Judgement rejected arguments the measures offered useful protections and held them to be void. The association undertook thenceforth to engage only in co-operation between its members, rather than price fixing and collusion.

In 1995, the association launched their Register of Qualified Steelwork Contractors with a stated aim to readily enable identification of appropriate steelwork contractors, and thereby ensure competition takes place.

Structural Steel Design Awards

In 1969 the association set up its Structural Steel Design Awards. Recent recipients include:

Coat of arms

The association was granted a coat of arms in 1987. The shield is a helmet on a background of red lines representing a framework of girders, and the crest  is a red lion symbolising the strength of steel, and also British nationality. The lion is dotted with gold bezants representing fair dealing in commerce; the yellow, blazing torch, held aloft by the lion, represents the association's enlightening message that structures should be of steel not concrete, and the crest, atop a red and gold torse, is set within a circle of steel ingots.

The motto depicted on the arms is Strength and Stability, intended as reference to both the association and structural steel.

The crest is used in the association's logo.

Membership

Full members

Full members are contractors that pay a levy to the association based on their sales of relevant steelwork in the prior year.

Present full members include:

Past full members include:

Associate members

Associate members are suppliers to structural steel contractors, and others with an interest in the industry's operation.

Recent associate members include:

References

External links
 Official website
 Steel Construction Info

Organisations based in the City of Westminster
Steel companies of the United Kingdom
Construction trade groups based in the United Kingdom
Structural steel
Organizations established in 1936
1936 establishments in the United Kingdom
Metallurgical industry of the United Kingdom
Price fixing convictions
Private companies limited by guarantee of the United Kingdom
Private companies limited by guarantee of England